Dietrich A. Stephan (born August 25, 1969) is an American human geneticist and entrepreneur who works in personalized medicine. Stephan is currently CEO of NeuBase Therapeutics and a General Partner in Cyto Ventures. Before NeuBase, Stephan was CEO of LifeX and Chairman and Professor of Human Genetics at the University of Pittsburgh. Prior, he was founding Chairman of the Neurogenomics Division at the Translational Genomics Research Institute. Stephan has founded or co-founded 14 biotechnology companies and advised many others. Stephan was co-founder of Navigenics, a personal genetics company.

Academic career 

Stephan received his B.Sc. in Biology from Carnegie Mellon University and his Ph.D. in Human Molecular Genetics from the University of Pittsburgh, followed by a fellowship at the National Human Genome Research Institute.

In 2003, Stephan worked at Translational Genomics Research Institute (TGen) as a Senior Investigator and founding Chairman of the Department of Neurogenomics. He later served as the Deputy Director of Discovery Research at TGen. His laboratory has identified the genetic basis of 20 single gene disorders, and several dozen complex genetic disorders using high-throughput technologies and strategies, many if which were developed by his team

He served as tenured full professor and Chairman of the Department of Human Genetics at the University of Pittsburgh from 2013 to 2018.

He has also implemented personalized genomic medicine clinical programs with sustainable business models. Stephan crafted the business case and obtained the initial funding for the Gene Partnership Project at Children's Hospital Boston and Harvard Medical School.

Stephan led the Population Genetics and Translational Acceleration effort at the Personalized Medicine Institute, a joint initiative between the University of Pittsburgh Schools of Health Sciences and UPMC, the largest integrated health system in the US. He held faculty positions at the Children's National Medical Center and Johns Hopkins University.

Stephan has published more than 150 peer-reviewed scientific articles in the scientific literature, in top tier journals such as Science, New England Journal of Medicine, Cell, and Proceedings of the National Academy of Sciences.

He served as the Chairman of the NIH Neuroscience Microarray Consortium for seven years. This was at the time the highest volume genome scanning infrastructure in the world, performing the International Autism Genome Project and the largest study in ALS (Lou Gehrig's Disease), among others.

Business career 

Stephan co-founded Navigenics, a personal genetics testing company, with oncologist  David Agus, which was among the first direct-to-consumer genomics company (acquired by Life Technologies).

In January 2007, bases on a publication from his group in Science, he co-founded Amnestix, a pharmaceutical company that focuses on the treatment of learning and memory impairment, acquired by Sygnis AG. In 2009, together  with Vern Norviel,  he  co-founded Aueon, Inc., a biotechnology company that invented and patented tumor sequencing and targeted therapeutic selection for cancer patients which is now emerging as the standard of care in oncology.

In 2011, he founded a next-generation genome sequencing and interpretation company, Lifecode (acquired by MedGenome).

In 2014, he helped found Pendulum therapeutics and served at its Chairman of the Board until 2018. Stephan has served at Chairman of the Board of Peptilogics, a rational peptide therapeutics development company since 2015.

In 2019, he founded NeuBase Therapeutics, a biotechnology company focused on developing  antisense therapy.

References 

 Stephan's profile on Big Health Wiki
 Stephan's profile on Business Week
 Official Navigenics site
 Official Amnestix site

American geneticists
American health care businesspeople
Carnegie Mellon University alumni
University of Pittsburgh alumni
1969 births
Living people